Artbank is an art rental program established in 1980 by the Australian Government. It supports contemporary Australian artists and encourages a wider appreciation of their work by buying artworks which it then rents to public and private sector clients.

History
Artbank was modelled on Canada's Art Bank, after then federal minister for the arts, Bob Ellicott, saw the Ottawa collection in 1979 and convinced Prime Minister Malcolm Fraser of the value of the idea. Fraser was enthusiastic, but treasurer John Howard took a little more convincing, before allotting  in seed funding. The collection was founded in 1980 with an endowment of 600 artworks from the National Gallery of Australia.

By 1992 Artbank had become so profitable that its government funding was cut off and it operated on self-generated income. It was nearly shut down in 1997, under the Howard government, but it was saved after much lobbying.

Function and governance
Artbank is part of the Department of Infrastructure, Transport, Regional Development and Communications (until January 2020, Department of Communications and the Arts, and various departments preceding that one).

The Director of Artbank is Tony Stephens.

The two core objectives of Artbank are "to provide direct support to Australian contemporary artists through the acquisition of their work and to promote the value of Australian contemporary art to the broader public". It is funded by leasing out artworks from its collection. It also supports the Government's cultural diplomacy aims, and, for the broader community, it makes Australian contemporary art accessible in a way that galleries and other institutions cannot do, by placing artworks in workplaces and a variety of public and private places around Australia and the world.

Description
, it has over 11,000 works by more than 3,500 Australian culturally diverse artists, including paintings, sculpture, video art, photographs, and ceramics. Prominent artists represented in the collection are Jeffrey Smart, Julie Dowling, John Olsen, Bill Henson, Gwyn Hanssen-Pigott, Robert Klippel, Emily Kame Kngwarreye, Bronwyn Oliver, William Robinson, Kitty Kantilla, Rover Thomas, Patricia Piccinini, Tracey Moffatt and Del Kathryn Barton. Because the artworks are chosen on cultural value and not in order to turn a profit, the institution is able to acquire some riskier pieces.  it has the fastest growing collection of digital  and multimedia art in Australia.

Artbank has collection stores in Sydney, Melbourne (opened 1996 in Armadale; moved to a converted warehouse in Collingwood in 2018) and Perth, Australia. The Collingwood location also offers a studio program to artists and designers, open to applications by residents.

Leasing
Artbank lends its artworks to corporations, government agencies, and private individuals. Restaurateur Kylie Kwong leased a number of artworks for her restaurant at Carriageworks arts centre in Sydney in 2018. Businesses are able to claim a 100% tax deduction for leasing from the institution. Works are sold from time to time, as part of stocktaking process.

References

External links

Art museums and galleries in Australia
1980 establishments in Australia
Organisations based in Sydney
Australian art